Fulham FC Women, previously known as Fulham LFC, WFC Fulham and Fulham FC Foundation Ladies, is a women's football club based in London, England. The team were dissolved as of 16 May 2006, but were later re-established with independence from Fulham F.C. The club dissolved for a second time in June 2010 when sponsors pulled out following a second successive relegation.  The club reformed again in 2014.

Fulham became the first Ladies' football team in Europe to turn full-time professional in April 2000. However, club chairman Mohamed Al-Fayed reverted the club to semi-professional status three years later. However, the club reformed in 2014.

History
Fulham L.F.C. were seen as the successor club to Friends of Fulham, winners of the FA Women's Cup in 1985 and twice runners-up in 1989 and 1990. After they moved to become what is now AFC Wimbledon Ladies, Fulham F.C. re-established a women's team, with women's football becoming very popular by the early 1990s. Fulham L.F.C.'s debut came in 1993 in the Greater London Division, and they eventually reached the FA Women's National Premier League, via the Greater London Premier Division, the South East Combination League and the FA Women's Premier League Southern Division, mirroring the progress of the men's professional club. After becoming professional themselves in 2000, a huge investment paid dividends in their first season, 2000–01, as they reached the FA Women's Cup final and won the South East Combination Women's Football League by a comfortable margin. Star players like Rachel Yankey and Katie Chapman were supplemented by high-profile overseas imports like Marianne Pettersen.

In the 2001–02 season, they won the FA Women's Premier League Southern Division, the London County Cup, the FA Women's Premier League Cup and the FA Women's Cup, scoring 342 goals and conceding just 15.

Fulham won the treble of FA Women's Cup, League Cup and Premier League in 2002–03, scoring 68 goals and conceding just 13. In 2003–04 they were the only English team to compete in the UEFA Women's Cup, and they came second in the Premier League National Division, despite reverting to semi-pro status at the end of the previous season.

During the 2005–06 season, having lost most of their professional squad, they struggled in the league and finished eighth.

On 16 May 2006, Fulham FC announced that they were withdrawing the team from the Women's Premier League and discontinuing the team altogether. The decision to dissolve the team was made on financial grounds, with Fulham officially laying the blame on a poor media coverage and poor league attendance. Fulham did announce plans to continue its Girls Development Centre, but clearly stated they would not be fielding any further league teams in the foreseeable future.

Following the withdrawal of the funding of the Ladies, Fulham FC let club officers, parents and players take over in order that the team could continue playing at the highest level of women's football – the FA Women's Premier League. A similar fate befell several other ladies' teams at around the same time. As there was no remaining connection with Fulham FC, it was decided to alter the club's name to Fulham WFC and then WFC Fulham, in order to make this separation clear.

The new committee was presented with a number of difficult problems to solve. Season 2006–2007 saw the club survive, albeit with the relegation of the first team from the Premier League National Division, but with the bonus of a County Cup final appearance. The team bounced straight back by winning the Premier League Southern Division in 2007–08, thanks largely to the goals of Ann-Marie Heatherson.

In 2008–09, WFC Fulham finished 12th and were relegated from the National Division. Another relegation into the Combination League followed in 2009–10 and the club folded due to the withdrawal of their sponsors. A new official Fulham ladies team restarted in 2014.

In 2014, the club reformed once more, as Fulham FC Foundation Ladies and entered the London & South East Regional Women's League. The club has remained in that division since, officially becoming re-incorporated into Fulham FC and rebranding as Fulham FC Women in 2018.

Players

Current squad

Former players
For details of all former players, see :Category:Fulham L.F.C. players.

Honours
For a detailed international record, see English women's football clubs in international competitions
 FA Women's Premier League National Division
 Champions: 2002–03
 FA Women's Premier League Southern Division
 Champions: 2001–02, 2007–08
 FA Women's Cup
 Winners: 1985 (as Friends of Fulham), 2002, 2003
 Runners-up: 1989, 1990 (as Friends of Fulham), 2001
 FA Women's Premier League Cup
 Winners: 2002, 2003
Runners-up: 2004
 London County Cup
 Winners: 2002–03

See also
Women's football (soccer)
List of women's football teams

References

 
Ladies
Association football clubs established in 1993
Women's football clubs in England
Women's football clubs in London
Defunct football clubs in England
Association football clubs disestablished in 2010
1993 establishments in England
2010 disestablishments in England
FA Women's National League teams
Defunct football clubs in London